Narayan Singh Amlabe (born 1 June 1951 Village Amlabe, Rajgarh district) is an Indian politician, member of the Indian National Congress, member of the Committee on Agriculture, and member of the Consultative Committee for the Ministry of Rural Development and the Ministry of Panchayati Raj. In the 2009 election he was elected to the 15th Lok Sabha from the Rajgarh Lok Sabha constituency of Madhya Pradesh.

He was earlier Sarpanch for Gram Panchayat Amlabe village and President of Janpad Panchayat Jirapur.

He is an agriculturist and resides at Rajgarh district. He is married to Dev Bai and has three daughters and two sons.

References

External links

India MPs 2009–2014
1951 births
Living people
People from Rajgarh district
Indian National Congress politicians from Madhya Pradesh
Lok Sabha members from Madhya Pradesh